San José State University (San Jose State or SJSU) is a public university in San Jose, California. Established in 1857, SJSU is the oldest public university on the West Coast and the founding campus of the California State University (CSU) system.

As of spring 2023, SJSU offers 150 bachelor's degree programs, 95 master's degrees, five doctoral degrees, 11 different credential programs and 42 certificates. SJSU is accredited by the WASC Senior College and University Commission.

SJSU's total enrollment was 35,751 in fall 2022, including nearly 8,900 graduate and credential students. SJSU's student population is one of the most ethnically diverse in the nation. As of fall 2022, graduate student enrollment, Asian, and international student enrollments at SJSU were the highest of any campus in the CSU system.

SJSU is consistently listed among the leading suppliers of undergraduate and graduate alumni to Silicon Valley technology firms, and philanthropic support of SJSU is among the highest in the CSU system.

SJSU sports teams are known as the Spartans, and compete in the NCAA Division I FBS Mountain West Conference.

History

Establishment 

San José State University was originally established in 1857 as the Minns Evening Normal School in San Francisco. It was founded by George W. Minns.

In 1862, by act of the California legislature, Minns Evening Normal School became the California State Normal School and graduated 54 women from a three-year program.

The school eventually moved to San Jose in 1871, and was given Washington Square Park at S. 4th and San Carlos Streets, where the campus remains to this day.

In 1881, a large bell was forged to commemorate the school. The bell was inscribed with the words "California State Normal School, A.D. 1881," and would sound on special occasions until 1946 when the college obtained new chimes. The original bell appears on the SJSU campus to this day, and is still associated with various student traditions and rituals.

In August 1882, a southern branch campus of the California State Normal School opened in Los Angeles, which later became the University of California, Los Angeles (UCLA). The southern branch campus remained under administrative control of the San Jose campus until 1887.

In 1921, the California State Normal School changed its name to the State Teachers College at San Jose.

In 1935, the State Teachers Colleges became the California State Colleges, and the school's name was changed again, this time to San Jose State College.

In 1972, upon meeting criteria established by the board of trustees and the Coordinating Council for Higher Education, SJSC was granted university status, and the name was changed to California State University, San Jose.

Finally, in 1974, the California legislature voted to change the school's name to San José State University.

Historical milestones 
In 1922, the State Teachers College at San Jose adopted the Spartans as the school's official mascot and nickname. Mascots and nicknames prior to 1922 included the Daniels, the Teachers, the Pedagogues, the Normals and the Normalites.

In 1930, the Justice Studies Department was founded as a two-year police science degree program. It holds the distinction of offering the first policing degree in the United States. A stone monument and plaque are displayed close to the site of the original police school near Tower Hall.

In 1942, the old gym (now named Yoshihiro Uchida Hall, after legendary SJSU judo coach Yosh Uchida) was used to register and collect Japanese Americans before sending them to internment camps. Coincidentally, Uchida's own family members were interred at some of these camps.

In 1963, in an effort to save Tower Hall from demolition, SJSU students and alumni organized testimonials before the State College Board of Trustees, sent telegrams and provided signed petitions. As a result of those efforts, the tower, a principal campus landmark and SJSU icon, was refurbished and reopened in 1966. The tower was again renovated and restored in 2007. Tower Hall is registered with the California Office of Historic Preservation.

During the 1960s and early 1970s, San Jose State College witnessed a rise in political activism and civic awareness among its student body, including major student protests against the Vietnam War. One of the largest campus protests took place in 1967 when Dow Chemical Company — a major manufacturer of napalm used in the war — came to campus to conduct job recruiting. An estimated 3,000 students and bystanders surrounded the 7th Street administration building, and more than 200 students and teachers lay down on the ground in front of the recruiters.

In 1982, the English department began sponsoring the annual Bulwer-Lytton Fiction Contest.

In 1985, the CADRE Laboratory for New Media was established. It is believed to be the second oldest media lab of its kind in the United States.

In 1999, San Jose State and the City of San Jose agreed to combine their main libraries to form a joint city-university library located on campus, the first known collaboration of this type in the United States. The combined library faced opposition, with critics stating the two libraries have very different objectives and that the project would be too expensive. Despite opposition, the $177 million project proceeded, and the new Martin Luther King Jr. Library opened on time and on budget in 2003. The new library has won several national awards since its initial opening.

During its 2006–07 fiscal year, SJSU received a record $50+ million in private gifts and $84 million in capital campaign contributions.

In 2008, SJSU received a CASE WealthEngine Award in recognition of raising over $100 million. SJSU was one of approximately 50 institutions nationwide honored by CASE in 2008 for overall performance in educational fundraising.

In October 2010, SJSU President Don Kassing publicly launched SJSU's first-ever comprehensive capital fundraising campaign dubbed "Acceleration: the Campaign for San Jose State University." The original goal of the multi-year campaign was to raise $150 million, but was later increased to $200 million because of the rapid success of the campaign. The campaign would eventually exceed its goal one year earlier than anticipated, raising more than $208 million.

In 2012, the NASA Ames Research Center in Mountain View, California, awarded SJSU $73.3 million to participate in the development of systems for improving the safety and efficiency of air and space travel. NASA scientists, SJSU faculty and graduate students worked collaboratively on this effort. The grant was the largest federal award in SJSU history.

University principals and presidents

Principals (1857–1899) 
George W. Minns (1857–62 and 1865–66)
Ahira Holmes, Principal (1862–65)
Henry P. Carlton, Principal (1866–67 and February to May 1868)
George E. Tait, Principal (July 1867 – February 1868)
William T. Lucky, Principal (May 1868 – August 1873)
Charles H. Allen, Principal (1873–89)
Charles W. Childs, Principal (1889–96)
Ambrose Randall, Principal (1896–99)

Presidents (1900–present) 
James McNaughton, President (1899–1900)
Morris Elmer Dailey, President (1900–18)
Lewis Ben Wilson, Acting President (1919–20)
William Webb Kemp, President (1920–23)
Alexander Richard Heron, Acting President, (July – September 1923)
Edwin Reagan Snyder, President (1923–25)
Herman F. Minssen, Acting President (1925–27)
Thomas William Macquarrie, President (1927–52)
John T. Wahlquist, President (1952–64)
Robert D. Clark, President (1964–69)
Hobert W. Burns, Acting President (1969–70)
John H. Bunzel, President (1970–78)
Gail Fullerton, President (1978–91)
J. Handel Evans, Acting President (1991–94)
Robert L. Caret, President (1995–2003)
Joseph N. Crowley, Interim President (Fall 2003)
Paul Yu, President (Summer 2004)
Jon Whitmore, President (August 2008 – July 2010)
Don W. Kassing, President (May 2005 – June 2008), Interim President (August 2004 – April 2005, August 2010 – July 2011)
Mohammad Qayoumi, President (August 2011 – August 2015)
Susan Martin, Interim President (August 2015 – June 2016)
Mary Papazian, President (July 2016 – December 2021)
Stephen Perez, Interim President (January 2022 – January 2023)
Cynthia Teniente-Matson, President (January 2023 - Present)

Campus 

The SJSU main campus comprises approximately 55 buildings situated on a rectangular,  area in downtown San Jose. The campus is bordered by San Fernando Street to the north, San Salvador Street to the south, S. 4th Street to the west, and S. 10th Street to the east.

California State Normal School did not receive a permanent home until it moved from San Francisco to San Jose in 1871. The original California State Normal School campus in San Jose consisted of several rectangular, wooden buildings with a central grass quadrangle. The wooden buildings were destroyed by fire in 1880 and were replaced by interconnected stone and masonry structures of roughly the same configuration in 1881.

These buildings were declared unsafe following the 1906 San Francisco earthquake and were being torn down when an aftershock of the magnitude that was predicted to destroy the buildings occurred and no damage was observed. Accordingly, demolition was stopped, and the portions of the buildings still standing were subsequently transformed into four halls: Tower Hall, Morris Dailey Auditorium, Washington Square Hall and Dwight Bentel Hall. These four structures remain standing to this day, and are the oldest buildings on campus.

Beginning in the fall of 1994, the on-campus segments of San Carlos Street, 7th Street and 9th Street were closed to automobile traffic and converted to pedestrian walkways and green belts within the campus. San Carlos Street was renamed Paseo de San Carlos, 7th Street became Paseo de César Chávez, and 9th Street is now called the Ninth Street Plaza. The project was completed in 1996.

Completed in 1999, the Business Classroom Project was a $16 million renovation of the James F. Boccardo Business Education Center.

Completed in 1999, the $1.5 million Heritage Gateway project was unveiled. The privately funded project featured construction of eight oversized gateways around the main campus perimeter.

In the fall of 2000, the SJSU Police Department, which is part of the larger California State University Police Department, opened a new on-campus, multi-level facility on 7th Street.

The $177 million Dr. Martin Luther King Jr. Library, which opened its doors on August 1, 2003, won the Library Journal's 2004 Library of the Year award, the publication's highest honor. The King Library represents the first collaboration of its kind between a university and a major U.S. city. The library is eight stories high, has  of floor space, and houses approximately 1.3 million volumes. San Jose's first public library occupied the same site from 1901 to 1936, and SJSU's Wahlquist Library occupied the site from 1961 to 2000.

In 2006, a $2 million renovation of Tower Hall was completed. Tower Hall (California Historical Landmarks in Santa Clara County, California No. 417) is among the oldest and most recognizable buildings on campus. It was dedicated in 1910 after numerous campus structures were either destroyed or heavily damaged in the 1906 earthquake. Tower Hall, Morris Dailey Auditorium, Washington Square Hall and Dwight Bentel Hall are the four oldest buildings on campus.

The SJSU student union is a four-story, stand-alone facility that features a food court, the Spartan Bookstore, a multi-level study area, ballrooms, a bowling alley, music room and large game room. In September 2010, a $90 million expansion and renovation of the student union commenced. The project added approximately  including construction of new ballrooms, food court, theater, meeting rooms and student program spaces. The expansion phase of the project was completed in June 2014. The renovation phase of the project was completed in August 2015.

Construction of a new, three-story,  on-campus health center at 7th Street and Paseo de San Carlos was completed in March 2015. The building houses the Student Health Center, Student Affairs office, Counseling Services and Wellness Center. The project was completed at a cost of over $36 million.

In August 2015, a $55 million renovation of the Spartan Complex was completed. The Spartan Complex houses open recreation spaces, gymnasiums, an indoor aquatics center, the kinesiology department, weight rooms, locker rooms, dance and judo studios, and other classroom space. The primary project objectives were to upgrade the structures to make them compliant with current building codes, correct ADA deficiencies, correct fire safety deficiencies, expand and modify existing structures, and hazmat abatement.

Residence halls 

The SJSU on-campus housing community comprises seven residence halls, which can accommodate a combined total of 4,458 students. The residence halls are identified as follows:

Campus Village (CV1) – CV1 opened in 2005, replacing three of six red brick residence halls known as "bricks" or "classics." CV1 was the first phase of the multi-phase Campus Village residence complex to be completed. The $200 million housing facility comprises three buildings ranging from seven to 15 stories tall. The complex can accommodate up to 2,600 students, and provides housing options for first-year students, non-freshmen, upper-classmen, graduate students, faculty, staff and guests of the university. The facility also includes a two-story underground parking garage for on-campus residents.

Campus Village (CV2) – CV2 opened in 2016, and was the second phase of the multi-phase Campus Village residence community to be completed. CV2 is an 850-bed, 10-story residence facility located on the SJSU campus near the intersection of 9th Street and Paseo de San Carlos. It is designated for first-year freshman. The high-rise facility increased total on-campus housing capacity to 4,458. The estimated cost of the building was $126 million.

Joe West Hall – Also referred to as a "classic," Joe West is a 12-story residence hall reserved for first-year freshmen. This hall houses approximately 650 students.

Washburn Hall – After Hoover Hall and Royce Hall were demolished in 2016, Washburn Hall became the only remaining red brick residence hall on the SJSU campus. Washburn Hall is reserved for first-year freshmen students only. Washburn offers a smaller living-learning environment for 288 residents.

International House (I-House) — Located on S. 11th Street approximately one block east of the Campus Village residence complex, SJSU's International House provides housing for 70 U.S. and international students. 

Campus Village (CV3) — CV3 is the proposed third and final phase of the Campus Village on-campus residence community. The construction of CV3 will be broken up into two phases. CV3 (Phase I) will entail replacing Washburn Hall with a new housing structure and new welcome center facing San Salvador Street along the southern edge of campus. CV3 (Phase I) is projected to break ground in 2024 with occupancy planned for fall 2027. 

The second phase of CV3 will entail replacing the existing Dining Commons with a new dining facility, as well as replacing Joe West hall with a new housing structure. The new dining facility will have a seating capacity of 900, and the new housing structure will contain 558 beds. A timeline for CV3 (Phase II) has not been finalized as of spring 2023. 

Once CV3 is completed, SJSU's total on-campus student housing capacity should increase from 4,458 to 4,928. The projected total cost for CV3 is approximately $334 million.

Alquist building — In January 2023, the California State University Board of Trustees officially approved a public-private partnership between SJSU and local investors that will allow the former Alfred E. Alquist state office building site to be transformed into new housing for SJSU faculty, staff and graduate students. Located one block west of the SJSU main campus, the 1.6-acre (0.65 ha) parcel will be the site of approximately 1,000 new housing rental units. Up to half of those units will be reserved for graduate students. The estimated total cost of the project is $750 million. The project's design phase is projected to be completed by early 2024. Construction is projected to begin in late 2024 and be completed in 2027.

Additional on-campus facilities 
It is the only nuclear science facility of its kind in the California State University system.

Located on the main campus, the Provident Credit Union Event Center seats approximately 5,000 people for athletic events and over 6,500 for concerts.

A new student recreation and aquatic center opened in April 2019. At a cost of $132 million, the new facility houses multiple gymnasiums, basketball courts, multiple weight and fitness centers, exercise rooms, rock climbing wall, indoor track, indoor soccer fields, and competition and recreation pools with support spaces. The new facility is located on the main campus at the corner of 7th Street and San Carlos on the site of the old aquatic center, which was demolished in 2017.

Construction of a new interdisciplinary science building broke ground in April 2019. At a projected cost of $181 million, the new facility will house teaching labs, research labs, faculty offices, a dean's suite and interdisciplinary spaces totaling . The project site is located on the southwest quadrant of campus just north of Duncan Hall. The new building is scheduled for occupancy in early 2023.

South Campus 

SJSU's South Campus is located in the Spartan Keyes neighborhood, just south of Downtown San Jose. The south campus also is home to student overflow parking. Shuttle buses run between the main campus and south campus every 10 to 15 minutes Monday through Thursday. 

A CEFCU Stadium east-side building addition broke ground in June 2019 and will cost approximately $57.6 million. The proposed  facility will house a new football operations center, which will include locker rooms, offices, an auditorium and seating on the 50-yard line. The project will also include a major renovation of the stadium's entire east side. The east-side building addition and stadium improvement project is scheduled to be completed by 2023.

In April 2014, a new $75 million master plan to renovate the entire South Campus was unveiled. The estimated cost has since been increased to $150 million including the cost of the new football stadium addition. The plan calls for construction of a golf training facility, new baseball and softball stadiums, new outdoor recreation and intramural facility, new soccer and tennis facilities, three beach volleyball courts and a new multilevel parking garage. The new golf, soccer and tennis facilities opened in 2017. The new softball facility opened in 2018, and the beach volleyball courts were completed in 2019. The intramural facility and parking garage were completed in 2021. Remaining projects are either under construction or still in the planning stages.

Off-campus facilities 
SJSU Simpkins International House (360 S. 11th Street, San Jose) provides housing for domestic as well as international students of the university. International House (also known as I-House) is a co-ed residence facility for 70 U.S. and international students attending San José State University. The building has served as a residence hall since 1980, and offers cultural exchanges for U.S. students as well as residents from abroad.

The SJSU Department of Aviation and Technology maintains a  academic facility at the Reid-Hillview Airport.

SJSU manages the Moss Landing Marine Laboratories in Moss Landing, California, on Monterey Bay. MLML is a cooperative research facility of seven CSU campuses. Construction of a new aquaculture laboratory at the MLML site was officially completed in August 2014. The building project included construction of a  aquaculture lab building and installation of a  tank slab area. The project was made possible by grants from the Packard Foundation.

Art and Metal Foundry (1036 S. 5th Street, San Jose)

Associated Students Child Development Center (460 S. 8th Street, San Jose)

SJSU International and Extended Studies facility (384 S. 2nd Street, San Jose). This off-campus classroom building houses SJSU's International Gateway Programs, a collection of classes geared toward introducing international students to the English language and American culture.

University Club (408 S. 8th Street, San Jose), is a 16-room, multi-level dining, special events, and bed-and-breakfast style residence facility for faculty, staff, visiting scholars and graduate students of the university. This building is currently occupied by Alpha Omicron Pi sorority in agreement with the university.

Known simply as North Fourth Street (210 N. 4th Street, San Jose), this four-story facility houses the Global Studies Institute, Governmental and External Affairs, International and Extended Studies, the Mineta Transportation Institute, the Processed Foods Institute, and the SJSU Research Foundation.

Organization
As a member institution of the California State University System, San Jose State falls under the jurisdiction of the California State University Board of Trustees and the chancellor of the California State University.

The chief executive of San José State University is the university president. Mary A. Papazian resigned as SJSU president effective December 21, 2021. CSU Chancellor Joseph Castro appointed Stephen Perez as interim university president effective January 3, 2022. Perez previously served as provost and vice president of academic affairs at California State University, Sacramento.

In November 2022, the California State University Board of Trustees named Cynthia Teniente-Matson as the new, permanent SJSU president. Teniente-Matson officially took over in January 2023. 

The university is organized into nine colleges:

Lucas College and Graduate School of Business
Connie L. Lurie College of Education
Charles W. Davidson College of Engineering
College of Graduate Studies
College of Health and Human Sciences (Formerly known as the College of Applied Sciences and Arts)
College of Humanities and the Arts
College of Professional and Global Education (Formerly known as the College of International and Extended Studies)
College of Science
College of Social Sciences

Additionally, SJSU has seven focused schools:

School of Art and Design
Lucas College and Graduate School of Business
School of Information
School of Journalism and Mass Communications
School of Music and Dance
The Valley Foundation School of Nursing
School of Social Work

Academics

As of spring 2023, San José State University offers 150 bachelor's degree programs, 95 master's degrees, five doctoral degrees, 11 different credential programs and 42 certificates. SJSU is accredited by the Western Association of Schools and Colleges (WASC).

SJSU's doctoral degree offerings include a Ph.D. program in library and information science offered jointly through Manchester Metropolitan University in Manchester, England, a doctor of audiology (Au.D.), an Ed.D. program in educational leadership, a doctor of nursing practice (DNP), and an occupational therapy doctorate (OTD).

As of fall 2022, some of the more popular fields of study at SJSU included engineering, business, library and information science, psychology, kinesiology and computer science.

Areas of study somewhat unique to SJSU include artificial intelligence, aviation, climate science, meteorology, packaging, software engineering, sustainable and green manufacturing technology, and transportation management.

As of fall 2022, the university's Charles W. Davidson College of Engineering, with 7,125 undergraduate and graduate students, was the largest college on campus. SJSU's Lucas College and Graduate School of Business was the second largest college on campus with a total enrollment of 6,329 undergraduate and graduate students. The university's College of Social Sciences, with 5,681 undergraduate and graduate students, was the third-largest college at SJSU. Enrollment wise, the Lucas College of Business is among the largest business schools in the country. It is accredited by the Association to Advance Collegiate Schools of Business (AACSB) at both the graduate and undergraduate levels, a distinction held by less than 5% of business programs worldwide.

Rankings

According to the 2022-2023 U.S. News & World Report college rankings, San Jose State is ranked No. 4 academically out of 59 public regional universities in the western United States. SJSU is ranked No. 16 among all 120 "regional universities" in the western U.S.

SJSU's undergraduate engineering program is ranked tied for No. 15 nationally among 230 public and private colleges that do not offer doctoral degrees in engineering, according to the 2022-2023 U.S. News & World Report college rankings. 

SJSU is ranked No. 108 out of approximately 500 institutions nationwide on the 2022 Forbes America's Top Colleges list. SJSU is ranked No. 43 nationally on the Forbes list of top public universities and colleges. Forbes also ranked SJSU No. 40 nationally out of approximately 300 colleges and universities on the most recent Forbes list of America's Best Value Colleges (2019).

Money magazine ranked San Jose State No. 31 nationally out of approximately 625 schools it evaluated for its 2022 "Best Colleges in America" ranking. Money also ranked SJSU No. 27 nationally on its 2022 list of Best Public Colleges, No. 39 on its list of Best Colleges for Engineering Majors, and No. 19 on Money's list of Best Colleges in the West. Finally, Money magazine ranked San Jose State No. 1 nationally on its 2020 list of "Most Transformative Colleges."

SJSU is ranked No. 291 out of more than 800 U.S. colleges and universities in the Wall Street Journal/Times Higher Education College Rankings 2022. The ranking is based on 15 individual performance indicators and responses from more than 170,000 current college students.

Washington Monthly ranked SJSU No. 53 nationally out of 603 master's universities (2022). Washington Monthly ranks colleges based on their "contribution to the public good in three broad categories: social mobility, research, and promoting public service."

The Webometrics Ranking of World Universities, which provides an assessment of the scholarly contents, visibility and impact of universities on the web, ranked SJSU No. 701 out of approximately 12,000 universities worldwide, and No. 200 out of approximately 3,200 U.S. colleges and universities (2022).

Undergraduate admissions 
Admission to SJSU is based on a combination of the applicant's high school cumulative grade point average (GPA) and standardized test scores. These factors are used to determine the applicant's California State University (CSU) eligibility index. More specifically, the eligibility index is a weighted combination of the applicant's high school grade point average during the final three years of high school and either the SAT or ACT score.

The CSU eligibility index is calculated by using either the SAT or ACT as follows: (Sum of SAT scores in mathematics and critical reading) + (800 x high school GPA) or (10 x ACT composite score without the writing score) + (200 x high school GPA).

In fall 2022, a total of 34,783 first-time, first-year (freshmen) applications were submitted, with 26,083 applicants accepted (75.0%) and 4,036 enrolling (15.5% of those accepted).

Among first-time, first-year (freshmen) students who enrolled in fall 2021, SAT scores for the middle 50.0% ranged from 1030–1310. ACT composite scores for the middle 50.0% ranged from 20–31. The average high school GPA for incoming freshmen was 3.54. Approximately 39.0% of all incoming freshmen had a high school GPA between 3.75 and 4.0. and 18% had an incoming average high school GPA of 4.0

In recent years, enrollment at SJSU has become impacted in all undergraduate majors, which means the university no longer has the enrollment capacity to accept all CSU-eligible applicants, including some from local high schools and community colleges. Although an applicant may meet the minimum CSU admission requirements, CSU-eligible applicants are no longer guaranteed admission.

Undergraduate graduation and retention 
Among all first-time freshmen students who enrolled at SJSU in fall 2017, 30% graduated within four years; 68% who enrolled in fall 2015 graduated within six years. Among new undergraduate transfer students who enrolled at SJSU in fall 2017, 33.0% graduated within two years, 69% graduated within three years, and 80.0% graduated within four years. Among first-time graduate students who enrolled at SJSU in fall 2017, 52.0% graduated within two years, 78% graduated within three years, and 83.0% graduated within four years.

The percentage of undergraduate students from the fall 2019 cohort returning in fall 2020 was 86.0% for full-time freshman students, 90.0% for new undergraduate transfer students, and 92.0% for first-time graduate students.

Faculty and research 
As of fall 2022, San José State University employed 2,243 faculty, 1,363 of whom (or about 61%) were full-time or equivalent (FTEF).

According to National Science Foundation survey data, in 2021 San Jose State's research and development expenditures totaled $60.1 million, placing it second in total R&D expenditures out of all 23 California State University (CSU) campuses and No. 189 out of more than 900 colleges and universities nationwide.

Research collections located at SJSU include the Ira F. Brilliant Center for Beethoven Studies, the Martha Heasley Cox Center for Steinbeck Studies, the J. Gordon Edwards Entomology Museum and the Carl W. Sharsmith Herbarium.

SJSU research partnerships include the SJSU Metropolitan Technology Center at NASA Ames Research Center, Moffett Field, the Cisco Networking Laboratory, and the Moss Landing Marine Laboratories. SJSU is also home to the Mineta Transportation Institute.

Additionally, the university operates the Survey and Policy Research Institute (SPRI), which conducts the quarterly, high-profile California Consumer Confidence Survey and many other research projects.

The SJSU Department of Kinesiology operates the Timpany Center (located at 730 Empey Way), a non-profit therapeutic facility open to all and owned by the County of Santa Clara. The center is dedicated to the health and fitness of those with a disability or age-related concerns.

SJSU is a member institution of the National Space Grant College and Fellowship Program.

Since 2014, SJSU has operated the Silicon Valley Big Data and Cybersecurity Center (BDCC). The center serves as a cybersecurity research and knowledge hub by creating multidisciplinary collaborations between faculty members from across the university and Silicon Valley tech companies.

On July 21, 2012, SJSU launched its first miniaturized satellite used for space research, TechEdSat, in a partnership with the NASA Ames Research Center.

Air Force ROTC 
Known academically as the Department of Aerospace Studies, SJSU's Detachment 045 is one of only two Air Force Reserve Officer Training Corps detachments in the San Francisco Bay Area. As such, Detachment 045 hosts "crosstown cadets" from other Bay Area schools including Santa Clara University, Stanford University and UC Santa Cruz. San Jose State students and crosstown cadets enrolled in the AFROTC program learn leadership skills and participate in a number of other mandatory activities leading to an active-duty U.S. military officer commission.

Student life 

As the oldest and one of the largest universities in the CSU system, SJSU attracts students from California, the United States, and 100 countries around the world. As of fall 2022, 35,751 students were enrolled at SJSU including 26,863 undergraduate students and 8,888 graduate and credential students. Approximately 51% of students were male and 49% were female. Graduate student enrollment at SJSU was the highest of any campus in the CSU system.

As of fall 2022, the average age of undergraduate students at SJSU was 22.2. The average age of graduate students was 29.0, and the average age of credential students was 31.7.

Approximately 4,500 students (12.5%) live in campus housing and community impact studies show an estimated 5,000 more students live within easy walking or biking distance of the campus. Additionally, approximately 45% of all first-year (freshman) students live in campus residence facilities.

As of 2022, there were over 475 recognized student organizations at SJSU. These include academic and honorary organizations, cultural and religious organizations, special interest organizations, fraternities and sororities, and a wide variety of club sports organizations.

Fraternities and sororities 
Fraternities and sororities have existed at SJSU since 1896. SJSU is home to 43 social fraternity and sorority chapters managed by Student Involvement. The 43 Greek organizations include social (NIC & NPC) and cultural (NPHC & USFC). Eighteen different fraternities and sororities maintain chapter homes in the residential community east of campus along S. 10th and 11th streets, north of campus along San Fernando Street, or south of campus along San Salvador Street, S. 8th Street, and E. Reed Street, in downtown San Jose. The only SJSU Greek organization not a part of the Interfraternity and Panhellenic Councils that maintains a chapter house is Alpha Phi Alpha. Alpha Sigma Phi and Pi Kappa Phi of the Interfraternity Council do not yet have chapter homes. 

An additional 26 fraternities are co-ed and are either major-related, honors-related, or community service related. The United Sorority and Fraternity Council (USFC) at San José State University was established in 2003. USFC is the coordinating body for the 17 cultural interest fraternities and sororities at SJSU. Approximately 6% of male students join social fraternities, and 6% of female students join social sororities.

Spartan Marching Band

The Spartan Marching Band comprises students from every field of study on campus, from first year undergraduates through graduate students, as well as several "open university" members. At each home football game, the Spartan Marching Band performs a completely new halftime show, plus a pre-game show and a post-game concert. The band reflects all the color and fanfare of major university sports pageantry. The band is unofficially known as "The Pride of the Spartans," and generally performs with a color guard and dance team. The band performs at all home football games, and also travels with the team to select games.

Spartan Squad
Founded in 2005, the Spartan Squad is the official student booster program at San Jose State. The Spartan Squad is run by the Associated Students and is open to all undergraduate and graduate students enrolled at San Jose State. Its stated mission is to increase student attendance at sporting events and cultivate school pride throughout the campus community. The Spartan Squad members are easily recognized wearing the group's signature gold T-shirts designed by San Jose State graphic design student Dang Nguyen. Class of 2006 graduates Matthew Olivieri and Brad Villeggiante are credited with founding the group.

Student press 

The school newspaper, The Spartan Daily, was founded in 1934 and is published three days a week when classes are in session. The publication follows a broadsheet format and has a daily print circulation of over 6,000, as well as a daily on-line edition. The newspaper is produced by journalism and advertising students enrolled in SJSU's School of Journalism and Mass Communications. The journalism school, including The Spartan Daily newsroom and other student press facilities, are housed inside Dwight Bentel Hall. The building was named after the department's founder and long time chairman, Dwight Bentel.  The journalism school also runs an on-campus advertising agency, Dwight, Bentel and Hall Communications.

Update News is a weekly, student-produced television newscast that airs every weekend on KICU, Channel 36 in San Jose. The newscast is produced by San Jose State broadcast journalism students, and has aired in the Bay Area since 1982.  The newscast previously aired on educational station KTEH. Update News also features a daily live webcast.

Equal Time is a news magazine show produced by the San Jose State School of Journalism and Mass Communications. Each half-hour episode examines a different issue in depth, and ends with a roundtable discussion featuring professors and other experts in search of solutions. Equal Time airs Saturday afternoons on KQED+ (Channel 54 or Comcast Channel 10) in the Bay Area.

Established in 1963, KSJS, 90.5 FM, is the university's student-run radio station. KSJS features live broadcasts of San Jose State athletic events, various types of music including electronic, urban, jazz, subversive rock, and rock en Español, as well as specialty talk shows.

Notable student organizations 
W6YL is a student-run amateur radio station that has been in continuous operation for  years. Originally founded in 1927 when SJSU was still known as San Jose State Teachers College, SJSU Amateur Radio Club W6YL is recognized as one of the oldest continuously operating student organizations on campus. The SJSU Amateur Radio Club is a federally licensed radio station that operates under the callsign W6YL on amateur radio bands.

Athletics 

San José State University has participated in athletics since it first fielded a baseball team in 1890. SJSU sports teams are known as the Spartans, and compete in the Mountain West Conference (MWC) in NCAA Division I.

San José State University sports teams have won NCAA national titles in track and field, golf, boxing, fencing and tennis. As of December 2022, SJSU has won 10 NCAA national Division 1 team championships and produced 50 NCAA national Division 1 individual champions. SJSU also has achieved an international reputation for its judo program, winning 50 National Collegiate Judo Association (NCJA) men's team championship titles and 23 NCJA women's team championship titles between 1962 and 2022.

SJSU alumni have won 20 Olympic medals (including seven gold medals) dating back to the first gold medal won by Willie Steele in track and field in the 1948 Summer Olympics. Alumni also have won medals in swimming, judo, water polo and boxing.

The track team coached by "Bud" Winter earned San Jose State the nickname "Speed City," and produced Olympic medalists and social activists Lee Evans, Tommie Smith and John Carlos. Smith and Carlos are perhaps best remembered for giving the raised fist salute from the medalist's podium during the 1968 Summer Olympics in Mexico City.  The track and field program was canceled in 1988 after a series of budget cuts and Title IX related decisions decimated the program.  The program was reinstated in 2016.

After an 11-2 finish in 2012, SJSU's football team achieved its first-ever BCS ranking and first national ranking since 1990. SJSU was ranked No. 21 in both the 2012 post-season Associated Press Poll and the USA Today Coaches' Poll.

The Spartan football team had another breakout season in 2020, cracking the AP Poll top-25 for the first time since 2012 and appearing in the College Football Playoff ranking at No. 24. The team also won its first conference championship title since 1991. The Spartans finished the 2020 season 7-1 and ranked No. 24 in the AP Poll.

Club sports 
In addition to its various NCAA Division I sports programs, San José State University has a very active club sports community consisting of approximately 25 sports and 50 teams. Many of the club sports teams are run and organized by students, although some of the more established teams employ full-time paid coaches and enjoy strong alumni support. The list of club sports active at SJSU includes:

Men's and women's archery, men's and women's badminton, baseball, men's and women's basketball, men's and women's bowling, men's and women's boxing, men's and women's cycling, dancesport, men's and women's dragon boat racing, esports, men's and women's fencing, men's and women's figure skating, men's and women's gymnastics, ACHA Division II and Division lll men's ice hockey, women's ice hockey, men's and women's judo, MCLA Division II men's lacrosse, women's lacrosse, mountain biking, men's and women's powerlifting, men's and women's quidditch, men's roller hockey, men's and women's rugby, salsa, men's and women's soccer, softball, men's and women's swimming, track and field, triathlon, ultimate Frisbee, men's and women's volleyball, men's and women's water polo, and men's and women's wrestling.

Traditions 
The old bell, which hung in a small tower to the right of the main entrance to the campus, was purchased and installed in 1881 at a cost of $1,217. The bell was rung regularly at eight o'clock each morning until the 1906 San Francisco earthquake stilled its voice. When Tower Hall was constructed in 1909, it was specially designed to house the old bell. The bell was rung on special occasions until the college obtained new carillon chimes in 1946. The old bell is displayed to this day on the Washington Square quad near Tower Hall.

In 1922, the State Teachers College at San Jose adopted the Spartans as the school's official mascot and nickname.  Mascots and nicknames prior to 1922 included the Daniels, the Teachers, the Pedagogues, the Normals and the Normalites. 

In 1925, students debated whether to change the school colors from gold and white to purple and white. Tradition won out, and the students decided to keep the original colors, gold and white. At some point prior to 1929 when the SJSU Alma Mater was officially adopted, blue was added as an official school color alongside gold and white.

According to information published in the old SJSU La Torre yearbook, Spardi Gras was first held in 1929 on George Washington's birthday. Spardi Gras was described in the 1929 edition of La Torre as "[an] event which met with unprecedented participance by the entire student body ... a gala occasion of play, sport, and merrymaking later authorized by the Executive Board as an annual event because of its great success." Spardi Gras was last mentioned in La Torre in 1960.

Another longstanding event at SJSU was "Spartan Revelries." According to information published in the 1960 edition of La Torre, Spartan Revelries was an "all-student college musical event written, produced and presented entirely by students." It's unclear when Spartan Revelries began, but some believe it started in 1929 as a grand finale to Spardi Gras. In 1949, an official Revelries board was established to carry out the business and management of each year's show, which had grown into a major annual event requiring the efforts of many students and several months of preparation.

Sparta Camp was an annual event held between 1953 and 1965. The retreat was hosted by the Associated Students and was held every spring at the Asilomar State Beach. The event was open to all students with an interest in student government, and students had to apply to go. Participants attended workshops and discussion groups on leadership. A similar event known as Freshman Camp was also held at Asilomar every September to help new students get oriented to the campus and the "Spirit of Sparta."

The chimes heard on the SJSU campus each quarter hour are Westminster chimes, which were a gift from the class of 1947. They ring the same tones as the famous Big Ben chimes in England.

Whenever the Spartan Fight Song or SJSU Alma Mater are played, students are asked to stand, remove their hats and sing along. Players and students typically sing the fight song at the end of football games.

Students and alumni, no matter where they are in the world, show their Spartan pride every Thursday by wearing Spartan blue and gold.

Each year during homecoming week, SJSU hosts a series of events leading up to the homecoming football game at CEFCU Stadium. Events include the Campus MovieFest Finale and Fire on the Fountain festival.

Alumni 

About 60 percent of San Jose State's 275,000 living alumni of record reside in the San Francisco Bay Area. The other 40 percent are scattered around the globe, with concentrations in Southern California, Seattle, Portland, Philadelphia, Washington, D.C. and New York City.

SJSU is consistently listed among the leading suppliers of undergraduate and graduate alumni to Silicon Valley science and technology firms. In 2015, San José State University was listed as the top feeder school for Apple Inc., which employed over 1,000 SJSU graduates at the time. SJSU ranked 9th on the list of top feeder schools for Facebook.

Some of the more notable SJSU alumni in science and engineering include Ray Dolby, founder of Dolby sound systems; Dian Fossey, primatologist and gorilla researcher; Gordon Moore, founder of Intel Corporation and creator of "Moore's law;" and Ed Oates, co-founder of Oracle.

Nearly 200 former SJSU students and graduates have founded, co-founded, served or serve as senior executives or officers of public and private companies reporting annual sales between $40 million and $26 billion. This list includes former Intel Corporation CEO, Brian Krzanich, and current Crown Worldwide Group CEO, billionaire James E. Thompson.

Notable companies founded by SJSU students and alumni include Dolby Laboratories (1965), Intel Corporation (1968), Specialized Bicycle Components (1974), Oracle Corporation (1977), Seagate Technology (1979) and WhatsApp (2008).

Musicians Doug Clifford and Stu Cook (Creedence Clearwater Revival), Tom Johnston and Patrick Simmons (The Doobie Brothers), Lindsey Buckingham and Stevie Nicks (Fleetwood Mac) and Paul Kantner (Jefferson Airplane) all attended San Jose State.

SJSU alumni Dick Vermeil and Bill Walsh earned a combined four Super Bowl victories as NFL head coaches.

San Jose State alumnus and 1964 U.S. Open winner Ken Venturi was named Sports Illustrated "Sportsman of the Year" and later inducted into the World Golf Hall of Fame.

See also 
 California Master Plan for Higher Education
 Education in California
 List of American state universities

Notes

References

External links 

San José State University athletics website

 
California State University campuses
Public universities and colleges in California
Universities and colleges in San Jose
Educational institutions established in 1857
1857 establishments in California
Schools accredited by the Western Association of Schools and Colleges
Tourist attractions in San Jose, California